Ladyburn distillery was a producer of single malt Scotch whisky that operated between 1966 and 1975.

History
The Ladyburn distillery was an expansion of the Girvan distillery, itself built in 1963 by William Grant & Sons Ltd. The Ladyburn malt whisky distillery was created in 1966 with the addition of two pot stills. The malt portion of the distillery was closed in 1975 and demolished in 1976.

The independent bottlers Signatory Vintage and Wilson and Morgan have released Ladyburn single malt under the name "Ayrshire", after the council area of Scotland in which Girvan is found.

External links
Scotch Whisky
Malt Madness

1966 establishments in Scotland
1975 disestablishments in Scotland
Companies based in South Ayrshire
Scottish malt whisky
Distilleries in Scotland
British companies established in 1966
Food and drink companies established in 1966
British companies disestablished in 1975